Kandi subdivision is an administrative subdivision of Murshidabad district in the state of West Bengal, India.

Overview
The Bhagirathi River splits the district into two natural physiographic regions – Rarh on the west and Bagri on the east. Kandi subdivision lies in the Mayurakshi Dwaraka plain in the south-eastern corner of the Rarh region. The Rarh region is undulating and contains mostly clay and lateritic clay based soil.

Geography

Subdivisions
Murshidabad district is divided into the following administrative subdivisions:

Administrative units
Kandi subdivision has 5 police stations, 5 community development blocks, 5 panchayat samitis, 50 gram panchayats, 552 mouzas, 510 inhabited villages, 1 municipality and 1 census town. The municipality is: Kandi. The census town is: Salar. The subdivision has its headquarters at Kandi, Murshidabad.

Police stations
Police stations in Kandi subdivision have the following features and jurisdiction:

Gram Panchayats
The subdivision contains 50 gram panchayats under 5 community development blocks:

 Kandi CD Block - Andulia, Hizole, Kumarsanda, Purandarpur, GokarnaI, Jashahari Anukha–I, Mahalandi–I, Gokarna–II, Jashahari Anukha–II and Mahalandi–II.
 Khargram CD Block - Eroali, Jaipur, Kirtipur, Padamkandi, Balia, Jhilli, Mahisar, Parulia, Indrani, Khargram, Margram and Sadal.
 Burwan CD Block - Burwan–I, Kalyanpur–II, Panchthupi, Sundarpur, Burwan–II, Kharjuna, Sabaldaha, Biprasekhar, Kuli, Sabalpur, Kalyanpur–I, Kurunnorun and Sahora.
 Bharatpur I CD Block - Alugram, Bharatpur, Gundiria, Sijgram, Amlai, Gadda, Jajan and Talgram.
 Bharatpur II CD Block - Kagram, Salar, Simulia, Tenya–Baidyapur, Malihati, Salu and Talibpur.

Blocks
Community development blocks in Kandi subdivision are:

Economy

Infrastructure
All inhabited villages in Murshidabad district have power supply.

See the individual block pages for more information about the infrastructure available.

Agriculture
Murshidabad is a predominantly agricultural district. A majority of the population depends on agriculture for a living. The land is fertile. The eastern portion of the Bhagirathi, an alluvial tract, is very fertile for growing Aus paddy, jute and rabi crops. The Kalantar area in the south-eastern portion of the district, is a low lying area with stiff dark clay and supports mainly the cultivation of Aman paddy. The west flank of the Bhagirathi is a lateritic tract intersected by numerous bils and old riverbeds. It supports the cultivation of Aman paddy, sugar cane and mulberry.

Given below is an overview of the agricultural production (all data in tonnes) for Kandi subdivision, other subdivisions and the Murshidabad district, with data for the year 2013-14.

Education
Murshidabad district had a literacy rate of 66.59% (for population of 7 years and above) as per the census of India 2011. Barhampur subdivision had a literacy rate of 72.60%, Kandi subdivision 66.28%, Jangipur subdivision 60.95%, Lalbag subdivision 68.00% and Domkal subdivision 68.35%.
Given in the table below (data in numbers) is a comprehensive picture of the education scenario in Murshidabad district for the year 2013-14:

Note: Primary schools include junior basic schools; middle schools, high schools and higher secondary schools include madrasahs; technical schools include junior technical schools, junior government polytechnics, industrial technical institutes, industrial training centres, nursing training institutes etc.; technical and professional colleges include engineering colleges, medical colleges, para-medical institutes, management colleges, teachers training and nursing training colleges, law colleges, art colleges, music colleges etc. Special and non-formal education centres include sishu siksha kendras, madhyamik siksha kendras, centres of Rabindra mukta vidyalaya, recognised Sanskrit tols, institutions for the blind and other handicapped persons, Anganwadi centres, reformatory schools etc.
The following institutions are located in Kandi subdivision:
Kandi Raj College was established in 1950 by the Kandi Raj family at Kandi.
Raja Birendra Chandra College was established in 1965 at Kandi. It was earlier known as Kandi Raj College of Commerce.
Bimal Chandra College of Law was established at Kandi in 2002 with the untiring efforts of Atish Chandra Sinha, a doyen of the Kandi Raj family. It is affiliated with the University of Kalyani and approved by the Bar Council of India.
Panchthupi Haripada Gouribala College was established in 1996 at Panchthupi.
Sunil Dhar Memorial B.P.Ed. College, a college for physical education, was established at Panchthupi in 2007.
Nagar College was established in 1998 at Nagar.
Muzaffar Ahmed Mahavidyalaya was established in 1986 at Salar.

Healthcare
The table below (all data in numbers) presents an overview of the medical facilities available and patients treated in the hospitals, health centres and sub-centres in 2014 in Murshidabad district.
 

.* Excluding nursing homes

Medical facilities in Kandi subdivision are as follows:

Hospitals: (Name, location, beds)
Kandi Subdivisional Hospital, Kandi, 250 beds
Home for Lunatic Vagrants, Mahalandi, 10 beds

Rural Hospitals: (Name, block, location, beds)
Burwan Rural Hospital, Burwan CD Block, Burwan, 30 beds
Khargram Rural Hospital, Khargram CD Block, Khargram, 50 beds
Gokarna Rural Hospital, Kandi CD Block, Gokarna, 15 beds
Bharatpur Rural Hospital, Bharatapur I CD Block, Bharatpur, 30 beds
Salar Rural Hospital, Bharatpur II CD Block, Salar, 30 beds

Primary Health Centres: (CD Block-wise)(CD Block, PHC location, beds)
Kandi CD Block: Bahara (6), Purandarpur (10), Lakshmikantapur (2)
Bharatpur I CD Block: Amlai (4), Jajan (10) 
Bharatpur II CD Block: Kagram (6), Simulia, Duttabarutia (6), Talibpur (10), Tenya (4)
Burwan CD Block: Kuli (6), Kharjuna (Subaldaha) (4), Panchthupi (10), Sundarpur (10)
Khargram CD Block: Margram (10), Jhili, Nonadanga (10), Parulia, Debiparulia (10), Indrani (2)

Electoral constituencies
Lok Sabha (parliamentary) and Vidhan Sabha (state assembly) constituencies in Kandi subdivision were as follows:

References

Subdivisions of West Bengal
Subdivisions in Murshidabad district